Yves Deroff (born 29 August 1978) is a French former professional footballer who played as a right-back.

Career
Born in Maisons-Laffitte, Yvelines, Deroff played club football for FC Nantes, RC Strasbourg Alsace, En Avant Guingamp and Angers SCO. He won Ligue 1 (2001) and won the Coupe de France twice with Nantes (1999 and 2000). He also won the Coupe de la Ligue with Strasbourg in 2005. Deroff suffered a double-broken leg as a result of a violent tackle by Patrick Blondeau in a league match against Marseille on 29 May 1999, preventing Deroff from playing for six months.

Whilst at Guingamp, then in Ligue 2, Deroff played in the 2009 Coupe de France Final in which they beat Rennes.

Deroff won the 1997 UEFA European Under-18 Championship with France.

References

External links
 
 

1978 births
Living people
People from Maisons-Laffitte
Footballers from Yvelines
French footballers
Association football defenders
France youth international footballers
Ligue 1 players
Ligue 2 players
FC Nantes players
En Avant Guingamp players
RC Strasbourg Alsace players
Angers SCO players